Martins Creek is a census-designated place in Lower Mt. Bethel Township, Pennsylvania. It is located along Martins Creek. Its population was 664 as of the 2020 U.S. census. Martins Creek is part of the Lehigh Valley metropolitan area, which had a population of 861,899 and was the 68th most populous metropolitan area in the U.S. as of the 2020 census. The Zip Code is 18063.

History
Circa 1730, a number of Scotch-Irish settled in a part of the town called Hunter's Settlement. Martin's Creek was first settled by Robert Lyle in 1741, with James Martin arriving around 1747. Martin operated a grist mill, and later served as a colonel in the American Revolution. In 1744, missionary David Brainerd began his work here with the Clistowackin band of Lenape Indians.

By the 1800s, the area had developed the name of Flatfield because of its level terrain. By the time of the Civil War, it was known as Martinsville, and later changed to Martin's Creek.

In 1939, exiled Russian prime minister Alexander Kerensky married Australian journalist Lydia Ellen Tritton in Martins Creek.

Industry
The major industry in the area was as the Alpha Portland Cement Company, which closed in 1964. In 1942 an explosion at the Lehigh Portland Cement Co. plant in nearby Sandts Eddy killed 31 people. The Hunter-Martin Settlement Museum commemorates the early history of the area.

Notable people
Alexander Kerensky, former president of the Russian Republic in 1917

References

Unincorporated communities in Northampton County, Pennsylvania
Unincorporated communities in Pennsylvania